This article contains information about the literary events and publications of 1972.

Events
May 22 – Cecil Day-Lewis, Poet Laureate of the United Kingdom, dies at Lemmons, the home of novelists Kingsley Amis and Elizabeth Jane Howard in North London, which he has shared with his wife and son – actors Jill Balcon and Daniel Day-Lewis – and at weekends with Kingsley's writer son Martin Amis and others.
June 4 – The poet Joseph Brodsky is expelled from the Soviet Union.
October 6–7 – The new Staatstheater Darmstadt is opened.
October 8 – The play Sizwe Bansi is Dead has its first performance at the Space Theatre (Cape Town), South Africa, before a multiracial audience. Playwright Athol Fugard directs, with co-writers John Kani and Winston Ntshona in lead roles.
October 10 – Sir John Betjeman is declared Poet Laureate of the United Kingdom, the first knight ever to be so.
"The three Marias", Maria Isabel Barreno, Maria Teresa Horta and Maria Velho da Costa, publish in Lisbon New Portuguese Letters (Novas Cartas Portuguesas), a collection challenging the Estado Novo dictatorship, to immediate success, but banned by censors as "pornographic and an offense to public morals". Its authors are imprisoned for "abuse of freedom of the press" and "outrage to public decency". Only after the 1974 "Carnation Revolution" does their trial end with the authors pardoned and the judge assigning "outstanding literary merit" to the book.
unknown date – Somali Latin alphabet is introduced.

New books

Fiction
Dritëro Agolli – The Rise and Fall of Comrade Zylo (Shkëlqimi dhe Rënja e Shokut Zylo, published in the magazine Hosteni)
Srikrishna Alanahalli – Kaadu
Jorge Amado – Teresa Batista Cansada da Guerra (Tereza Batista: Home from the Wars)
 Eric Ambler – The Levanter
Martin Amis – The Rachel Papers
Isaac Asimov – The Gods Themselves
John Braine – The Queen of a Distant Country
Taylor Caldwell – Captains and the Kings
Italo Calvino – Invisible Cities (Le città invisibili)
John Dickson Carr – The Hungry Goblin: A Victorian Detective Novel
Angela Carter – The Infernal Desire Machines of Doctor Hoffman
Agatha Christie – Elephants Can Remember
Brian Cleeve – Tread Softly in this Place
Michael Crichton – The Terminal Man
Robertson Davies – The Manticore
L. Sprague de Camp and Catherine Crook de Camp, editors – 3000 Years of Fantasy and Science Fiction
R. F. Delderfield – To Serve Them All My Days
Margaret Drabble, B. S. Johnson and others – London Consequences
Frederick Forsyth – The Odessa File
Günter Grass – Aus dem Tagebuch einer Schnecke (From the Diary of a Snail)
Graham Greene – The Honorary Consul
Peter Handke – A Sorrow Beyond Dreams (Wunschloses Unglück)
James Herriot – All Creatures Great and Small
Georgette Heyer – Lady of Quality
George V. Higgins – The Friends of Eddie Coyle
Witi Ihimaera – Pounamu Pounamu (short story collection)
P. D. James – An Unsuitable Job for a Woman
Dan Jenkins – Semi-Tough
Thomas Keneally – The Chant of Jimmie Blacksmith
Carl Jacobi – Disclosures in Scarlet
Derek Lambert 
Blackstone
The Red House
Halldór Laxness – Guðsgjafaþula (Mantra of God's Gift)
Ira Levin – The Stepford Wives
Audrey Erskine Lindop – Journey Into Stone
Frank Belknap Long – The Rim of the Unknown
Robert Ludlum – The Osterman Weekend
David McCullough – The Great Bridge
John D. MacDonald – The Scarlet Ruse
Ngaio Marsh – Tied Up in Tinsel
Barry N. Malzberg – Beyond Apollo
Vladimir Nabokov – Transparent Things
Kenzaburō Ōe (大江 健三郎) – The Day He Himself Shall Wipe My Tears Away (みずから我が涙をぬぐいたまう日, Mizukara Waga Namida o Nugui Tamau Hi)
Chaim Potok – My Name Is Asher Lev
Josef Škvorecký – The Miracle Game (Mirákl)
David Storey – Pasmore
Arkady and Boris Strugatsky – Roadside Picnic («Пикник на обочине», Piknik na obochine)
Paul Theroux – Saint Jack
Hunter S. Thompson – Fear and Loathing in Las Vegas
Irving Wallace – The Word

Children and young people
Chinua Achebe – How the Leopard Got His Claws
Richard Adams – Watership Down
E. M. Almedingen – Anna
Rev. W. Awdry – Tramway Engines (twenty-sixth in The Railway Series of 42 books by him and his son Christopher Awdry)
Roald Dahl – Charlie and the Great Glass Elevator
Rumer Godden
The Diddakoi (also Gypsy Girl)
The Old Woman Who Lived in a Vinegar Bottle
Robert E. Howard (with Alicia Austin) – Echoes from an Iron Harp
Tove Jansson – The Summer Book
Michael de Larrabeiti – The Redwater Raid
Ronald McCuaig – Gangles
James Marshall – George and Martha (first in a series of seven eponymous books)
Helen Nicoll (illustrated by Jan Pieńkowski) – Meg and Mog (first in series)
Graham Oakley – The Church Mouse (first in the Church Mice series of twelve books)
Bill Peet
The Ant and the Elephant
Countdown to Christmas
Mary Renault – The Persian Boy
Marjorie W. Sharmat – Nate the Great
Judith Viorst – Alexander and the Terrible, Horrible, No Good, Very Bad Day

Drama
Alan Ayckbourn – Absurd Person Singular
Samuel Beckett – Not I
Bill Bryden – Willie Rough
Caryl Churchill – Owners
Hanay Geiogamah – Body Indian
Eugène Ionesco – Macbett
Vijay Tendulkar
Ghashiram Kotwal
Sakharam Binder

Non-fiction
The American Museum of Natural History – An Introduction
Jacob Bronowski – The Ascent of Man
L. Sprague de Camp
Great Cities of the Ancient World
with Catherine Crook de Camp – Darwin and His Great Discovery'''
Carlos Castaneda – Journey to Ixtlan: The Lessons of Don JuanWinston Graham – The Spanish ArmadasBruce Joyce and Marsha Weil – Models of Teaching (first edition)
Michael Kammen – People of Paradox: An Inquiry Concerning the Origins of American CivilizationRichard Mabey – Food for FreeElaine Morgan – The Descent of WomanRobert Newton Peck – A Day No Pigs Would DieFrances Yates – The Rosicrucian EnlightenmentJohn Howard Yoder – The Politics of JesusBirths
January 1 – Maile Meloy, American novelist and short story writer
February 11 – Noboru Yamaguchi (山口 登), Japanese light novelist and game scenario author (died 2013)
March 29 - Ernest Cline, American science-fiction novelist and screenwriter
May 22 – Max Brooks, American horror author and screenwriter
May 27 – Maggie O'Farrell, Northern Ireland-born novelist
July 21 – Josué Guébo, Ivorian writer and academic
August 6 - Paolo Bacigalupi, American science-fiction and fantasy writer
August 18 – Adda Djørup, Danish poet and fiction writer
August 26 - Paula Hawkins, British novelist and journalist
September 6 – China Miéville, English science fiction novelist
September 19
Cheryl B (Cheryl Burke), American poet and spoken word artist
N. K. Jemisin, American science fiction and fantasy writer
November 4 – Yiyun Li (李翊雲), Chinese American writer of fiction in English
November 26 - James Dashner, American writer of speculative fiction
December 20 – Gen Urobuchi, Japanese novelist and screenwriterunknown datesShimon Adaf, Israeli poet and novelist
Zinnie Harris, British dramatist
Rabee Jaber, Lebanese novelist
Charlotte Mendelson, English novelist
Marente de Moor, Dutch novelist and columnist
Ben Rice, English novelist
Fran Wilde, American science fiction novelist

Deaths
January 1 – Eberhard Wolfgang Möller, German playwright and poet (born 1906)
January 7 – John Berryman, American poet (suicide; born 1914)
January 8 – Kenneth Patchen, American poet and author (born 1911)
January 17 – Betty Smith, American novelist (born 1896)
February 2 – Natalie Clifford Barney, American writer and patron (born 1876)
February 15 – Edgar Snow, American political writer (cancer, born 1905)
March 4 – Richard Church, English poet and novelist (born 1893
March 9 – Violet Trefusis, English writer (born 1894)
March 11 – Fredric Brown, American genre novelist (born 1906
March 14 – Giangiacomo Feltrinelli, Italian publisher (born 1926)
April 10 – Laurence Manning, Canadian science fiction author (born 1899)
April 16 – Yasunari Kawabata (川端 康成), Japanese fiction writer, Nobel laureate (born 1899)
May 22 – Cecil Day-Lewis, Irish-born Poet Laureate of the United Kingdom and (as Nicholas Blake) novelist (born 1904)
May 28 – Violette Leduc, French novelist and memoirist (born 1907)
June 24 – R. F. Delderfield, English novelist and playwright (born 1912)
August 2 – Helen Hoyt (Helen Lyman), American poet (born 1887)
August 9 – Ernst von Salomon, German writer (born 1902)
August 17 – Alexander Vampilov, Russian dramatist (drowned fishing, born 1937)
August 22 – Ernestine Hill, Australian travel writer (born 1899)
September 21 – Henry de Montherlant, French novelist, dramatist and essayist (suicide, born 1895)
September 27 – S. R. Ranganathan, Indian mathematician and librarian (born 1892)
October 5 – Ivan Yefremov, Soviet paleontologist and science fiction author (born 1908)
November 1 – Ezra Pound, American poet (born 1885)
November 12 – José Nucete Sardi, Venezuelan historian and diplomat (born 1897)
November 29 – Victor Bridges (Victor George de Freyne), English genre novelist, playwright and poet (born 1878)
December 10 – Mark Van Doren, American poet, writer and critic (born 1894)
December 13 – L. P. Hartley, English novelist (born 1895)
December 23 – Abraham Joshua Heschel, Polish-born American theologian and rabbi (born 1907)unknown datesWasif Jawhariyyeh, Palestinian Arab diarist, poet and composer (born 1897)
Donar Munteanu, Romanian poet and magistrate (born 1886)

Awards
Nobel Prize for Literature: Heinrich Böll

Canada
See 1972 Governor General's Awards for a complete list of winners and finalists for those awards.

France
Prix Goncourt: Jean Carrière, L'Epervier de MaheuxPrix Médicis French: Maurice Clavel, Le Tiers des étoilesUnited Kingdom
Booker Prize: John Berger, G.Carnegie Medal for children's literature: Richard Adams, Watership DownCholmondeley Award: Molly Holden, Tom Raworth, Patricia Whittaker
Eric Gregory Award: Tony Curtis, Richard Berengarten, Brian Oxley, Andrew Greig, Robin Lee, Paul Muldoon
James Tait Black Memorial Prize for fiction: John Berger, GJames Tait Black Memorial Prize for biography: Quentin Bell, Virginia WoolfUnited States
American Academy of Arts and Letters Gold Medal for the novel, Eudora Welty
Hugo Award: Philip José Farmer, To Your Scattered Bodies Go (1971)
Nebula Award: Isaac Asimov, The Gods ThemselvesNewbery Medal for children's literature: Robert C. O'Brien, Mrs. Frisby and the Rats of NIMHPulitzer Prize for Drama: Not awarded
Pulitzer Prize for Fiction: Wallace Stegner – Angle of ReposePulitzer Prize for Poetry: James Wright, Collected PoemsElsewhere
Miles Franklin Award: Thea Astley, The AcolytePremio Nadal: José María Carrascal, GroovyViareggio Prize: Romano Bilenchi, Il bottone di Stalingrado''

Notes

References

 
Years of the 20th century in literature